The 25th Annual Putnam County Spelling Bee is a musical comedy with music and lyrics by William Finn, with a book written by Rachel Sheinkin, conceived by Rebecca Feldman with additional material by Jay Reiss. The show centers on a fictional spelling bee set in a geographically ambiguous Putnam Valley Middle School. Six quirky adolescents compete in the Bee, run by three equally quirky grown-ups.

The 2005 Broadway production, directed by James Lapine and produced by David Stone, James L. Nederlander, Barbara Whitman, Patrick Catullo, Barrington Stage Company and Second Stage Theater, earned good reviews and box-office success and was nominated for six Tony Awards, winning two, including Best Book. The show has spawned various other productions in the United States, and other countries.

An unusual aspect of the show is that four real audience members are invited on stage to compete in the spelling bee alongside the six young characters. During the 2005 Tony Awards, former presidential candidate Al Sharpton competed. Another amusing aspect of the show is that the official pronouncer, usually an improv comedian, provides ridiculous usage-in-a-sentence examples when asked to use words in a sentence. At some shows, adult-only audiences (over age 16) are invited for "Parent-Teacher Conferences"  also known as "adult night at the Bee". These performances are peppered with sexual references and profanity inspired by R-rated ad-libs made during rehearsals.

The Broadway cast album was released on May 31, 2005, and is available from Ghostlight Records, an imprint of Sh-K-Boom Records. The original Broadway cast recording was nominated for a Grammy Award.

In April 2021, a Disney film adaptation was announced to be in the works.

On January 25, 2023, the school board for Cardinal Local School District in Ohio halted a student production of the musical on the grounds that it was "vulgar."
The Cardinal School District denied their decision was made because the musical depicts two gay characters.

Background and original productions
The musical was based upon C-R-E-P-U-S-C-U-L-E, an original improvisational play created by Rebecca Feldman and performed by The Farm, a New-York-based improvisational comedy troupe. Sarah Saltzberg, Wendy Wasserstein's weekend nanny, was in the original production, and Wasserstein recommended that Finn see the show. Finn brought Rachel Sheinkin on board, and they worked together with Feldman to transform "C-R-E-P-U-S-C-U-L-E" into a scripted full-length musical.

Spelling Bee was workshopped and developed at the Barrington Stage Company (BSC), Massachusetts, where Julianne Boyd is the Artistic Director, in two different stages. In February 2004, a workshop was done in which a first act and parts of a second act were created – this stage of the process was directed by Michael Barakiva and Feldman. The script was fleshed out and the show was given a fuller production in July 2004, directed by Feldman and Michael Unger. Dan Knechtges choreographed the workshop, summer productions, and the Broadway production. Dana Harrel produced both productions as the Producer of Stage II at BSC. Several cast members, Dan Fogler, Jay Reiss, and Sarah Saltzberg remained from C-R-E-P-U-S-C-U-L-E. Robb Sapp (later replaced by Jose Llana when Sapp moved on to Wicked), Dashiell Eaves (replaced by Derrick Baskin), Jesse Tyler Ferguson, Celia Keenan-Bolger (joined as Olive Ostrovsky in the summer), Lisa Howard, and Deborah S. Craig were added to the cast, and a full script was created.

The musical opened Off-Broadway at the Second Stage Theatre on January 11, 2005 in previews, officially on February 7, 2005, and closed on March 20, 2005. The production won several awards, among them the 2005 Lucille Lortel Awards, Outstanding Musical and 2005 Drama Desk Awards, Outstanding Ensemble Performance.

Spelling Bee premiered on Broadway at the Circle in the Square Theatre on April 15, 2005 and closed on January 20, 2008 after 1,136 performances and 21 previews. The director was James Lapine and the choreographer was Dan Knechtges. The show won Tony Awards for Best Book (Rachel Sheinkin) and Best Featured Actor (Dan Fogler).

Subsequent productions
The first production outside the United States was at the Melbourne Theatre Company in Melbourne, Australia, from January 18, 2006 to February 25 at the Playhouse, Arts Centre Melbourne. It starred Marina Prior as Ms. Peretti, David Campbell as Chip, and Magda Szubanski as Barfée.  The production, which won the 2006 Helpmann Award for Best Musical, was then presented by the Sydney Theatre Company at the Sydney Theatre in 2007. It again starred Prior and Szubanski, now joined by Lisa McCune as Olive. The Sydney season opened on June 11, 2007 and closed in August 2007.

The musical was produced in San Francisco, California, at the Post Street Theatre opening on March 1, 2006 and closing on September 3, 2006.  In Chicago the run began on April 11, 2006 at the Drury Lane Theatre, Water Tower Place, closing on March 25, 2007.  The production was directed by James Lapine.  In Boston it opened at the Wilbur Theatre on September 26, 2006 and closed December 31, 2006.  The majority of the San Francisco cast moved to the Boston production.

The Equity U.S. National Tour began in Baltimore, Maryland at the Hippodrome Theatre on September 19, 2006 going through May 2007, visiting over 30 cities across the U.S.  From May 24 to June 17, 2007, the original Broadway cast reunited for a limited four-week run at the Wadsworth Theater in Los Angeles. The musical returned to Barrington Stage Company, where it originated, in 2008, and ran from June 11 to July 12, 2008.  The production included several cast members from the touring company and was a co-production with North Shore Theatre. The first performance in-the-round was at the North Shore Music Theatre in Beverly, Massachusetts from August 12–31, 2008.

In 2007, the first translated production opened in Seoul, South Korea, with all of the music and dialogue in Korean, but the words were spelled in English.  In September 2008, a German-language adaptation premiered as Der 25 Pattenser Buchstabierwettbewerb.

The 2008–2009 Non-Equity U.S. National Tour premiered on October 11, 2008 at the Union Colony Civic Center in Greeley, Colorado, with an official opening in Fort Collins, Colorado on October 14.

The Mason Street Warehouse, Saugatuck Center for the Arts, Saugatuck, Michigan, opened on August 14 and ran through August 31, 2009, directed by Kurt Stamm.

The musical made its UK premiere at the Donmar Warehouse, London, beginning previews on February 11, 2011. It officially opened on February 21, and closed on April 2. The director was Jamie Lloyd.

Spelling Bee made its Scandinavian debut in September 2012 in Oslo, Norway.

Spelling Bee was performed for the first time in Israel, with Hebrew subtitles in October 2012, at the AACI J-Town Playhouse theater in Jerusalem. Spelling Bee had an additional series of performances in September, 2017 in Israel by the organization The Stage, at the Beit Yad leBanim theatre in Tel Aviv.

The original Broadway cast of Spelling Bee reunited for a one-night only 10th anniversary concert at The Town Hall on July 6, 2015. All actors reprised their roles for the performance with the exception of Celia Keenan-Bolger as Olive Ostrovsky, with Jenni Barber who had previously played the role on Broadway stepping into the role: Keenan-Bolger joined the cast for the concert's finale, performing Olive's monologue as she had a decade prior. The concert was organized in tribute to original production stage manager Andrea "Spook" Testani-Gordon, who passed away from cancer the previous November.

Plot

Act 1
The spellers are introduced as they enter and they sing about their anticipation of the bee ("The Twenty-Fifth Annual Putnam County Spelling Bee"). Moderator Rona Lisa Peretti speaks privately to Olive Ostrovsky, who has not yet paid the entrance fee. She then introduces the official word pronouncer, Douglas Panch, and comfort counselor, Mitch Mahoney. Mahoney leads the spellers in the Pledge of Allegiance and Panch explains the rules ("The Spelling Rules / My Favorite Moment of the Bee 1").

The spelling bee begins. Leaf Coneybear's word is capybara, which he has no idea how to spell, but he ends up spelling it correctly while in a trance. Olive is shown to be shy and reserved, a result of her largely absent parents. She has come to love spelling by reading the dictionary in her home ("My Friend, the Dictionary"). When William Barfée is called to spell for the first time, Rona describes his unusual technique – he spells the word out on the ground with his foot to get a visual before speaking it. After a few spellers get easy words, the others rant about how the element of luck makes the bee unfair ("Pandemonium"). Logainne then gets "Cystitis", and is shown studying with her two often-arguing fathers in a flashback. When Leaf is called the second time, he reminisces about how his family calls him "dumb" ("I'm Not That Smart").

Barfée is called, and sings about his technique ("Magic Foot"). When Marcy is called again, she correctly spells "qaimaqam", proving herself to be the best speller, though she is somewhat hurt when Rona claims that she is "all business". Chip Tolentino is called next, but he is reluctant to take his turn because he has an erection after fantasizing about Leaf's sister. Under threat of disqualification (a fact not helped because he is asked to spell a somewhat erotic sounding word), he misspells his word and Mitch hauls him off ("Pandemonium (Reprise) / My Favorite Moment of the Bee 2").

At this point, the last audience speller is eliminated. Mitch sings a special serenade to this audience member for making it this far ("Prayer of the Comfort Counselor").

Act 2
Chip passes through the audience selling snacks, the punishment for being the first eliminated. He explains to the audience why he lost ("My Unfortunate Erection (Chip's Lament)"). Barfée taunts Chip, who throws a bag of peanut M&M's at him. Barfée is allergic to peanuts, so Olive picks them up for him. Olive and Barfée converse before the second half of the bee begins, and Barfée begins to develop a crush on Olive.

Logainne describes her two overbearing fathers and the stress that they put on her ("Woe is Me"). In a montage sequence, the bee is shown progressing through many rounds, ending with Leaf's elimination. He walks away with his head held high, having proven to himself that he is smarter than his family gave him credit for ("I'm Not that Smart (Reprise)").

Marcy reveals more about her stressful life ("I Speak Six Languages"). She is given the word camouflage, to which she sighs, "Dear Jesus, can't you come up with a harder word than that?" Jesus then appears to her and teaches her that she is in control of her own life. Resolved to do what she wants rather than what is expected of her, she intentionally misspells the word and exits excitedly ("Jesus / Pandemonium (Reprise #2)").

Olive gets a call from her father, who she has been hoping would arrive. Panch attempts to disallow her from answering the phone, but she persuades Rona to take the call for her. Logainne then begins an ad-libbed rant about the bee, her fathers, and current political events. Panch lashes out at Logainne and is escorted offstage by Rona and Mitch. One of Logainne's fathers jumps onstage to calm Logainne down and pours some of his soda on the floor to make Barfée's foot stick and thus disrupt his technique.

With Panch calmed down, Olive is called to spell. She imagines her parents being there and giving her the love that she always has wanted and yearned for ("The I Love You Song"). Barfée is called to spell next, and spells his word correctly despite the soda causing his foot to stick. Logainne misspells her next word ("Woe is Me (Reprise)") and Rona is excited that it has come down to the final two ("My Favorite Moment of the Bee 3").

The finals are shown through another montage ("Second"), and Olive and Barfée continue to grow closer. Eventually, Olive misspells a word, giving Barfée a chance to win. He is torn between winning and letting Olive win, but with Olive's encouragement, he spells his word correctly. Panch awards Barfée the trophy and two hundred dollar prize, and in a surprise act of charity, pays Olive's entrance fee, calling it a "runner-up prize." Olive congratulates Barfée, and each character reads a sentence or two about what they do in the years and decades after the main action of the play ends ("Finale").

Musical numbers
(Songs are not listed in the Playbill since, with audience members on stage, the timing of the "Goodbye" songs varies with each show and because it could spoil who wins the bee.)

Act 1 (in some shows)
 "The Twenty-Fifth Annual Putnam County Spelling Bee" – Chip, Rona, Leaf, Logainne, Barfée, Marcy, Olive
 "The Spelling Rules" ‡ – Panch, Spellers, Rona, Mitch
 "My Favorite Moment of the Bee" ‡ – Rona
 "My Friend, the Dictionary" – Olive, Chip, Leaf, Logainne, Rona, Company
 "The First Goodbye" – Company
 "Pandemonium" – Chip, Olive, Logainne, Leaf, Barfée, Marcy, Mitch
 "I'm Not That Smart" – Leaf
 "The Second Goodbye" – Company
 "Magic Foot" – Barfée, Company
 "Pandemonium (Reprise)" ‡ – Mitch, Company
 "My Favorite Moment of the Bee (Reprise)" ‡ – Rona
 "Prayer of the Comfort Counselor" – Mitch, Company

Act 2 (in some shows)
 "My Unfortunate Erection/Distraction (Chip's Lament)" – Chip
 "Woe is Me" – Logainne, Carl, Dan, and Company
 "Spelling Montage" – Panch, Spellers
 "I'm Not That Smart (Reprise)" – Leaf
 "I Speak Six Languages" – Marcy, Females
 "Jesus" – Marcy, Females
 "The I Love You Song" – Olive, Olive's Mom, Olive's Dad
 "Woe is Me (Reprise)" – Logainne, Mitch
 "My Favorite Moment of the Bee (Reprise 2)" ‡ – Rona
 "Second" ‡ – Barfée, Olive, Company
 "Second (Part 1)" – Barfée, Olive, Company
 "Weltanschauung" – Barfée, Company
 "Barfée and Olive Pas de Deux" – Company
 "Second (Part 2)" – Barfée, Olive, Company
 "The Champion" – Rona, Company
 "Finale" – Company
 "The Last Goodbye" – Company

‡ Combined into one track on the cast album

There is a song on the cast album, called "Why We Like Spelling". This song is sung by all the spellers, but is not in the Broadway production or in the licensed productions.

A song entitled "The 25th Annual Putnam County Spelling Bee Massacres the 12 Days of Christmas" was released online as a holiday track sung by the cast. It reveals several different instances of events within the lives of the characters, such as Coneybear being given 2 right socks named "Phil", Olive discussing various places her dad forgets her at, Barfée ruling his sea anemone circus from his basement, Panch's urine laced with Ritalin, Rona's most recent boyfriend breaking up with her, Mitch ending up and making calls from prison, Schwartzy explaining her dads giving her stomach ulcers, Chip playing with his little league baseball team, and Marcy receiving the 7th book of Moses (which Schwartzy repeatedly objects to, claiming there's only 5) while fighting with her understudy who was taking her place because "Deborah [S. Craig, the regular Marcy actress] hurt her knee".

Characters

Major characters
 Rona Lisa Peretti: The number-one realtor in Putnam County, a former Putnam County Spelling Bee Champion herself, and returning moderator. She is a sweet woman who loves children, but she can be very stern when it comes to dealing with Vice Principal Panch, who has feelings for her that she most likely does not return. It is implied that she sees much of herself in Olive Ostrovsky. Her favorite moment of the Bee is in the minutes before it starts, when all the children are filled with the joy of competition, before they begin to resent each other. She later declares that she likes how everyone has an equal chance of winning, citing as an example that last year's winner can be this year's loser and vice versa. Another favorite moment is when the last winners go head to head for the top spot because it is so suspenseful and filled with hope. Ms. Peretti herself won the Third Annual Putnam County Spelling Bee by spelling "syzygy", which she recounts at the very beginning of the opening number.
 Vice Principal Douglas Panch: After five years' absence from the Bee, Panch returns as judge. There was an "incident" at the Twentieth Annual Bee, but he claims to be in "a better place" now (or so we think), thanks to a high-fiber diet and Jungian analysis. He is infatuated with Rona Lisa Peretti, but she does not return his affections.
 Mitch Mahoney: The Official Comfort Counselor. An ex-convict, Mitch is performing his community service with the Bee, and hands out juice boxes to losing students.
 Olive Ostrovsky: A young newcomer to competitive spelling. Her mother is in an ashram in India, and her father is working late, as usual, but he is trying to come sometime during the bee. She made friends with her dictionary at a very young age, helping her to make it to the competition.
 William Morris Barfée: A Putnam County Spelling Bee finalist last year, he was eliminated because of an allergic reaction to peanuts. His famous "Magic Foot" method of spelling has boosted him to spelling glory, even though he only has one working nostril and a touchy personality. He has an often-mispronounced last name: it is Bar-FAY, not BARF-ee ("there's an accent aigu", he explains with some hostility). He develops a crush on Olive. At the end of the play he wins the spelling bee.
 Logainne "Schwartzy" SchwartzandGrubenierre: Logainne is the youngest and most politically aware speller, often making comments about current political figures, with two overbearing gay fathers pushing her to win at any cost. She is somewhat of a neat freak, speaks with a lisp, and knows she will return to the bee next year.
 Marcy Park: A recent transfer from Virginia, Marcy placed ninth in last year's nationals. She speaks six languages, is a member of all-American hockey, a championship rugby player, plays Chopin and Mozart on multiple instruments, sleeps only three hours a night, hides in the bathroom cabinet, and is getting very tired of always winning. She is a total over-achiever, and attends a Catholic school called "Our Lady of Intermittent Sorrows". She is also not allowed to cry.
 Leaf Coneybear: A homeschooler and the second runner-up in his district, Leaf gets into the competition on a lark: the winner and first runner-up had to go to the winner's Bat Mitzvah. Leaf comes from a large family of former hippies and makes his own clothes. He spells words correctly while in a trance. In his song, "I'm Not That Smart", he sings that his family thinks he is "not that smart", but he insinuates that he is merely easily distracted. Most of the words that he is assigned are South American rodents with amusing names.
 Charlito "Chip" Tolentino ("Tripp Barrington" in the original workshop, "Isaac 'Chip' Berkowitz" in the Chicago production): A Boy Scout and champion of the Twenty-Fourth Annual Putnam County Spelling Bee, he returns to defend his title. Relatively social and athletic, as he plays little league, Chip expects things to come easily but he finds puberty hitting at an inopportune moment.
 Three or four spellers from the audience: Audience members are encouraged to sign up to participate before the show, and several are chosen to spell words on stage. In touring productions, local celebrities are sometimes selected.

Minor characters
(All can be doubled by the actors playing the major characters.)
 Carl Grubenierre: One of SchwartzandGrubenierre's fathers; he has set his heart on his little girl winning the Bee, no matter what he has to do, including sabotaging William's foot. Usually played by the actor who plays Leaf.
 Dan Schwartz: SchwartzandGrubenierre's other father; he is more laid back and doting than Carl but is still intent on his daughter winning the Bee. Usually played by the actor who plays Mitch.
 Leaf's Dad: Doubtful and finds his son annoying and unintelligent. Usually played by the actor who plays Barfée.
 Leaf's Mom: Overprotective and doubtful of her son's abilities to stand up to the competition. Usually played by the actor who plays Logainne.
 Leaf's Siblings: Not very confident of Leaf's abilities. Usually played by the remaining spellers (both cast and the volunteer audience spellers).
 Olive's Mom and Dad: She is in India, he is working late, but they appear in Olive's imagination to encourage her and tell her they love her. Usually played by the actors who play Miss Peretti and Mitch.
 Jesus Christ: Appears to Marcy in a moment of crisis. Usually played by the actor who plays Chip.

Casting history
The principal casts of notable productions of The Twenty-Fifth Annual Putnam County Spelling Bee

Notable Broadway cast replacements included Jennifer Simard as Rona, Barrett Foa, Rory O'Malley, and Stanley Bahorek as Leaf, Josh Gad as Barfée, and Mo Rocca and Darrell Hammond as Panch.

Audience interaction and words used
Audience interaction
About half an hour before the show begins, audience members in the lobby are given the chance to sign up to participate in the show as "spellers." The registration form asks for name, occupation, hobbies, description of clothing, spelling ability, and age range. Interviewers look for people with no acting experience, unique names, traits, and backgrounds. The audience participants are taken backstage prior to the show and are shown where to stand when called from the audience and given instruction about what to do when called upon to spell. They are asked to request a definition of each word and its usage in a sentence, and to attempt to spell each word rather than giving up. The final audience member to be eliminated is usually given an exceptionally difficult word they are sure to miss; regardless of the spelling the cast reacts with incredulity at their "success," and the next word is "belled" as incorrect before the attempt is completed. During the performance, the actors sitting next to the audience participants periodically whisper hints about when to stand, sit, move in "slow motion," "freeze" or hang on because the seating platform unit is about to spin.

Ms. Peretti calls the spellers to the stage at the beginning of the show, and they are given badges to wear that say "Finalist." As the show proceeds, each one is eliminated with successively more difficult words. The final audience participant to be eliminated is serenaded by Mitch ("Prayer of the Comfort Counselor") on-stage. Mitch also gives each eliminated finalist (both audience members and regular characters) a juice box and a hug.

Katharine Close, the 2006 winner of the Scripps National Spelling Bee, was invited to be a contestant at a performance of the show. She was the last speller from the audience to be eliminated and survived fourteen rounds.

The musical treats the audience members as if they were the audience at the fictitious spelling bee. For example, the characters single out audience members as their "family" members. For example, Barfée periodically refers to an age-appropriate woman near the stage as "mom." Similarly, Chip is distracted by an attractive female audience member (or male in the adults-only version), contributing to a misspelling.  He is the first contestant eliminated and is thus forced to sell snacks in the audience in the manner of the refreshment hawkers at a sports event.  Other characters frequently walk through the auditorium among the audience during the show, sometimes integrating the audience into the show and occasionally dropping the "fourth wall".

Words used
Examples of words spelled by characters in performances of Spelling Bee include astrobleme, cat, dinosaur, hasenpfeffer, origami (Adult Show), and weltanschauung.  Words spelled by the audience volunteers are often unscripted and sometimes improvised by the cast to gently poke fun at the volunteer speller. Past examples include:  dystopia, cenacle, elephant, hemidemisemiquaver, homunculus, cow, jihad, lysergic acid diethylamide, castoreum and didgeridoo spelt by Rolf Harris. Julie Andrews missed "supercalifragilisticexpialidocious" when she was a guest speller on KIDS night on Broadway, 2007.

Critical response
Charles Isherwood, in his review of the Broadway production for The New York Times, wrote "Most crucially, the affectionate performances of the six actors burdened with the daunting challenge of inhabiting young souls have not been stretched into grotesque shape by the move to a large theater... William Finn's score sounds plumper and more rewarding than it did Off Broadway. If it occasionally suggests a Saturday morning television cartoon set to music by Stephen Sondheim, that's not inappropriate. And Mr. Finn's more wistful songs provide a nice sprinkling of sugar to complement the sass in Rachel Sheinkin's zinger-filled book... Mr. Lapine has sharpened all the musical's elements without betraying its appealing modesty." (NY Times Critics Pick)

Film adaptation
In April 2021, Walt Disney Pictures announced plans to develop a film adaptation of the musical, to be produced by Dan Lin and Jonathan Eirich through their Rideback banner, with Ryan Halprin as executive producer.

Awards and nominations

Original Off-Broadway production

Original Broadway production

References

External links

 MusicalTalk Podcast discussing the Orlando production
 Internet Broadway Database listing
 Lyrics to the songs
 Fogler and Saltzberg (original Broadway cast) interview, Downstage Center at American Theatre Wing.org
 William Finn (composer) interview – Downstage Center at American Theatre Wing.org, December 2006
 25th Annual Putnam County Spelling Bee, The « Musical Cyberspace
 Listing at guidetomusicaltheatre.com
 The 25th Annual Putnam County Spelling Bee at the Music Theatre International website
 The website for the Norwegian production of Spelling Bee
 The Norwegian production team's website

2004 musicals
Broadway musicals
One-act musicals
Scripps National Spelling Bee
Musicals by William Finn
Tony Award-winning musicals
Teen musicals